Yuka Ono (born 2 August 1990) is a Japanese sprint canoeist. She qualified for the 2020 Summer Olympics. 
 
She participated at the 2018 Asian Games, and 2018 ICF Canoe Sprint World Cup.

References

External links 
Yuka Ono - Japanese Olympic Committee

Living people
1990 births
Japanese female canoeists
Sportspeople from Akita Prefecture
People from Yurihonjō
Olympic canoeists of Japan
Canoeists at the 2020 Summer Olympics
Asian Games competitors for Japan
Canoeists at the 2018 Asian Games
Medalists at the 2018 Asian Games
Asian Games bronze medalists for Japan
Asian Games medalists in canoeing